Nurul Islam Chowdhury (1925–3 October 1995) is a Bangladesh Awami League politician and the former Member of Parliament of Chittagong-11.

Career
He was elected to parliament from Chittagong-11 as a Bangladesh Awami League candidate in 1973.

References

Awami League politicians
1st Jatiya Sangsad members
1925 births
1995 deaths
Bangladesh Krishak Sramik Awami League central committee members